InvenSense Inc. is an American consumer electronics company, founded in 2003 in San Jose, California by Steve Nasiri. They are the provider of the MotionTracking sensor system on chip (SoC) which functions as a gyroscope for consumer electronic devices such as smartphones, tablets, wearables, gaming devices, optical image stabilization, and remote controls for Smart TVs. InvenSense provides the motion controller in the Nintendo Wii game controller and the Oculus Rift DK1. Its motion controllers are found in the Samsung Galaxy smartphones and most recently in the Apple iPhone 6.

History 
Founded in 2003, InvenSense is headquartered in San Jose, California with offices in Wilmington, Massachusetts, China, Taiwan, Korea, Japan, France, Canada, Slovakia and Italy.

In December 2016, the company was acquired by electronics company TDK for US$1.3 billion. InvenSense became part of the MEMS Sensors Business Group in 2017. In February 2018, Chirp Microsystems joined InvenSense through its acquisition by TDK.

Technical capabilities
InvenSense MotionTracking tracks complex user motions with the use of motion sensors such as microelectromechanical gyroscopes, (including 3-axis gyroscopes), accelerometers, compasses, and pressure sensors. the system then calibrates data, and creates a single data stream. With complex movement tracking comes a drain on battery life. In June, 2014, the company announced a low power gyroscope chip that used just under six milliwatts of power in a chip and was just 0.75 millimeters thick.

InvenSense also provides Optical Image Stabilisation for Smartphone cameras, which are important to detect hand movements and reduce shake in photographs. InvenSense's compact gyroscope was designed to provide antishake features on the smallest camera phones.

See also 
 List of system-on-a-chip suppliers

References

Companies based in San Jose, California
2003 establishments in California
Accelerometers
Technology companies based in the San Francisco Bay Area
System on a chip
Microelectronic and microelectromechanical systems
Electronics companies of the United States
Image stabilization